Caspase recruitment domain-containing protein 11 also known as CARD-containing MAGUK protein 1 (Carma 1) is a protein in the CARD-CC protein family that in humans is encoded by the CARD11 gene.

Function 

The protein encoded by this gene belongs to the membrane-associated guanylate kinase (MAGUK) family, a class of proteins that functions as molecular scaffolds for the assembly of multiprotein complexes at specialized regions of the plasma membrane. This protein is also a member of the CARD protein family, which is defined by carrying a characteristic caspase-associated recruitment domain (CARD). CARD11 (CARMA1) has a domain structure similar to that of CARD10 (CARMA3) and CARD14 (CARMA2) as a member of the CARD-CC family with a C terminal MAGUK domain (the so-called CARMA proteins). The CARD domain of proteins in the CARD-CC family have been shown to specifically interact with BCL10, a protein known to function as a positive regulator of NF-κB activation by recruitment and activation of MALT1. When overexpressed in cells, this protein family activates NF-κB and induces the phosphorylation of BCL10.

CARD11 is critical for T cell and B cell function and is activated after T cell receptor or B cell receptor stimulation. After receptor stimulation, CARD11 is phosphorylated by PKC-θ (in T cells) or PKC-β (in B cells). The phosphorylation induces formation of filamentous CARD11 multimers that recruit BCL10 and MALT1, which in turn activates NF-κB. Loss of function mutations in CARD11 cause severe combined immunodeficiency (SCID) since the function of cells critical for adaptive immunity are disrupted.

Interactions 

CARD11 has been shown to interact with BCL10.

References

External links

Further reading 

 
 
 
 
 
 
 
 
 
 
 
 
 
 
 

Proteins